John Caspar Wild (or J.C. Wild) (1804 – August 12, 1846) was a Swiss-American painter and lithographer. He created early city views and landscapes of Philadelphia, Cincinnati, St. Louis, and Davenport, Iowa. He specialized in hand-colored lithographs. These views, particularly the Valley of the Mississippi Illustrated, were some of the first depictions of the American West.

Early life
Wild was born in Richterswil in the Canton of Zürich in Switzerland.

Career
He moved to Paris, France. In 1832, he moved to Philadelphia, Pennsylvania. He later moved to St. Louis, Missouri. In summer 1844, he moved a final time, to Davenport, Iowa, a small town in the upper Mississippi River Valley. 

Wild fell gravely ill with tuberculosis in the summer of 1846, and he was taken in by Davenport millinery businessman George L. Webb. On his deathbed, Wild reflected upon his childhood and said that he yearned to die in homeland in Switzerland, but it was a wish that was to not be fulfilled. Wild died on August 12, 1846. Wild was laid to rest nearly on the banks of the river, which he had painted for years. Wild's grave site was unmarked for decades.

Notable collections
University of Pennsylvania, 1842, from collection of the Library Company of Philadelphia

Pennsylvania Hospital, circa 1840, Library Company of Philadelphia

Further reading
 Reps, John William, and J. C. Wild. 2006. John Caspar Wild: painter and printmaker of nineteenth-century urban America. St. Louis: Missouri Historical Society Press.  Designed by Steve Hartman of  Creativille, Inc. 
 Wild, J. C., and Lewis Foulk Thomas. 1948. The valley of the Mississippi: illustrated in a series of views, accompanied with historical descriptions. St. Louis, Mo: Joseph Garnier. (this is a reprint; original edition published 1841–2)

References

External links

John Cushman Abbott Exhibit Supplement  includes a discussion of Wild and his book The Valley of the Mississippi Illustrated in a Series of Views, a slide show of illustrations from the book, and a downloadable pdf of the book.

1804 births
1846 deaths
19th-century American painters
19th-century American male artists
American male painters
American landscape painters
American lithographers
Swiss painters
People from Richterswil
Swiss emigrants to the United States
People from Davenport, Iowa